Katie Finneran (born January 22, 1971) is an American actress best known for her Tony Award-winning performances in the Broadway play Noises Off in 2002, and the musical Promises, Promises in 2010.

Career

Film
Finneran's biggest film role was as Judy Rose in the remake of George A. Romero's Night of the Living Dead. Her film credits include You've Got Mail, Chicken Little, Liberty Heights, Bewitched, Miss Congeniality 2: Armed and Fabulous, and Death to Smoochy.

Television
She co-starred in television series Wonderfalls. She was also featured as a part of the cast on the Fox show The Inside, in the short-lived CBS sitcom Bram & Alice, and in many guest roles in shows like Frasier, Sex and the City and Oz. In 2007 Finneran was featured in the new series Drive. She played the sister of the main character, Alex Tully (Nathan Fillion).

In an interview for the DVD of the full series of Wonderfalls, Finneran said that when asked if she felt nervous about playing lesbian immigration attorney Sharon Tyler on Wonderfalls she replied, "I'd rather have people think that I'm a lesbian than a lawyer."

In 2012, she co-starred in the Fox sitcom I Hate My Teenage Daughter.  From 2013 to 2014, she played Leigh Henry on the NBC sitcom, The Michael J. Fox Show. She has also appeared in the Netflix series Bloodline.

In April 2019, CBS announced that Finneran would be starring in a recurring role as Naomi in the CBS All Access series Why Women Kill.

In 2022, Finneran starred in The Gilded Age on HBO.

Theatre
Finneran "has played barflies and rich girls, giggly ingénues and world-weary lowlifes..."

She played a "lovely but dim fashion model" in the original Broadway production of Neil Simon's Proposals in 1997–98, Sally Bowles in the 1998 Broadway revival of Cabaret (from November 21, 2000 to January 18, 2001), and call girl Cora in the 1999 Broadway revival of The Iceman Cometh, opposite Kevin Spacey. She also has appeared in My Favorite Year with Tim Curry, John Guare's Bosoms and Neglect, and Smell of the Kill, with Kristen Johnston.

She won the Tony Award and the Drama Desk Award for Best Featured Actress in a Play in 2002 for her role as Brooke Ashton in the Broadway revival of Noises Off.

Finneran appeared Off-Broadway at the Laura Pels Theater in the Greg Kotis play Pig Farm, in the original opening cast as Tina. The play opened in June 2006 and ran through September 23, 2006.

Finneran appeared in the original cast of Love, Loss, and What I Wore, which opened Off-Broadway at the Westside Theater in September 19, 2009 for a four-week engagement ending on October 18, 2009. The play "....is performed by a rotating cast of five. For the first four weeks of the run Ms. [Rosie] O'Donnell is joined by the actresses Tyne Daly, Katie Finneran and Natasha Lyonne, and Samantha Bee..." Finneran returned to the show (after her initial four-week engagement) on November 18, 2009, to fill in for Kristin Chenoweth, and continued on in the play in the next four-week rotation as well (from December 14, 2009, to January 3, 2010). She appeared in the first Broadway revival of the musical Promises, Promises as Marge MacDougall, opposite Kristin Chenoweth and Sean Hayes. The show opened March 27, 2010 and Finneran left the show on October 10, 2010 because of her pregnancy. She won the 2010 Tony Award for Best Featured Actress in a Musical for this role.

Finneran played the role of Miss Hannigan in the 2012 Broadway revival of the musical Annie. She left the role in May 2013 to pursue a TV pilot.

Finneran returned to Broadway in 2015 to star in Terrence McNally's It's Only a Play as Julia Budder.

Personal life
Finneran was born in Chicago, Illinois, of Irish Catholic extraction. She was raised in Miami, Florida, where she attended the New World School of the Arts High School. She attended Carnegie Mellon University in Pittsburgh for one year before moving to New York City at age 19 to study acting with Uta Hagen at HB Studio.

Finneran and actor Darren Goldstein married on August 22, 2010; the couple have two children.

Filmography

Film

Television

References

External links
 
 "Promises, Promises: Katie Finneran leaves 10 Oct", New York Theatre Guide, August 24, 2010

1971 births
Living people
Actresses from Chicago
American film actresses
American stage actresses
American television actresses
American people of Irish descent
Actresses from Miami
Drama Desk Award winners
Tony Award winners
Carnegie Mellon University College of Fine Arts alumni
20th-century American actresses
21st-century American actresses